Pierced from Within is the third album by the death metal band Suffocation, released in 1995. "Synthetically Revived" is a re-recording of the song of the same name from the Human Waste EP and "Breeding the Spawn" is a re-recording of the title track from the band's previous album.

Both this album and Effigy of the Forgotten have been re-released by Roadrunner Records as part of the Two from the Vault series.

Before 2013's Pinnacle of Bedlam, this was the only full-length album by Suffocation not to feature Mike Smith as a drummer.

It is the band's last album with guitarist Doug Cerrito and bassist Chris Richards, and the only with drummer Doug Bohn.

At 45 minutes and 31 seconds, Pierced From Within is the band’s longest album to date.

Track listing
All songs written by Suffocation except where noted.

Personnel
Suffocation
 Frank Mullen - vocals
 Terrance Hobbs - lead guitar
 Doug Cerrito - rhythm guitar
 Chris Richards - bass
 Doug Bohn - drums

Production
 Guest co-lyrics for "Torn into Enthrallment" by Lee Harrison (Monstrosity)
 Produced by Scott Burns & Suffocation
 Engineered and mixed by Scott Burns
 Assistant engineer: Dave Welner
 Recorded and mixed at Morrisound Recording, Tampa, FL, USA
 Mastered by Mike Fuller at Fullersound, Miami, FL, USA
 Cover art: Hiro Takahashi

References

Suffocation (band) albums
1995 albums
Roadrunner Records albums
Albums produced by Scott Burns (record producer)